The Little Rock River is a tributary of the Rock River,  long, in southwestern Minnesota and northwestern Iowa in the United States.  Via the Rock, Big Sioux and Missouri rivers, it is part of the watershed of the Mississippi River.

It has also been known as "Little Rock Creek".

Course

See also
List of Iowa rivers
List of Minnesota rivers

References

Columbia Gazetteer of North America entry
DeLorme (1998).  Iowa Atlas & Gazetteer.  Yarmouth, Maine: DeLorme.  .
DeLorme (1994).  Minnesota Atlas & Gazetteer.  Yarmouth, Maine: DeLorme.  .

Rivers of Iowa
Rivers of Minnesota
Rivers of Lyon County, Iowa
Rivers of Nobles County, Minnesota
Rivers of Osceola County, Iowa
Tributaries of the Mississippi River